Christian Bronsard (born December 25, 1977) is a German-born Canadian former professional ice hockey goaltender. Bronsard played the 1997–98 season with the Canada men's national ice hockey team.

On October 30, 1999, while playing against Rochester, Bronsard scored a goal for the Syracuse Crunch to become only the fourth goaltender in American Hockey League history and first and only goalie in Crunch history to record a goal.

Awards and honours

References

External links

1977 births
Living people
Hull Olympiques players
Baton Rouge Kingfish players
Syracuse Crunch players
Quebec Citadelles players
Tallahassee Tiger Sharks players
Canadian ice hockey goaltenders